Trigonopterus javensis is a species of flightless weevil in the genus Trigonopterus from Indonesia.

Etymology
The specific name is derived from the island of Java.

Description
Individuals measure 1.76–2.09 mm in length.  The body is slightly hexagonal in shape.  General coloration is rust-colored.

Range
The species is found around elevations of  around Mount Gede, Mount Halimun Salak National Park, Mount Cakrabuana, and Mount Sawal in the Indonesian province of West Java, and on the Dieng Plateau and Mount Slamet in the Central Java province.  The species is generally found inhabiting montane forests.

Phylogeny
T. javensis is part of the T. dimorphus species group.

References

javensis
Beetles described in 2014
Beetles of Asia
Insects of Indonesia